Into the Inferno is a 2016 documentary film directed by Werner Herzog. In it, Herzog explores active volcanoes from around the world, and the people who live near them, with volcanologist Clive Oppenheimer. The film had its world premiere at the Telluride Film Festival on 3 September 2016 before its debut on Netflix on 28 October 2016.

Synopsis
An exploration of active volcanoes in Indonesia (Mount Sinabung), Iceland, North Korea and Ethiopia (Erta Ale), Herzog follows volcanologist and Clive Oppenheimer, who hopes to minimize the volcanoes’ destructive impact. Herzog's quest is to gain an image of our origins and nature as a species. He finds that the volcano is mysterious, violent, and rapturously beautiful and instructs that "there is no single one that is not connected to a belief system."

Release
The film had its world premiere at the Telluride Film Festival on 3 September 2016. The film also screened at the Toronto International Film Festival on 13 September 2016. The film was released on Netflix worldwide on 28 October 2016.

Critical reception 
On review aggregator Rotten Tomatoes, the film holds an approval rating of 92% based on 49 reviews, with an average rating of 7.50/10. The website's critical consensus reads, "Into the Inferno finds director Werner Herzog observing some of the most beautiful -- and terrifying -- wonders of the natural world with his signature blend of curiosity and insight." Metacritic, which uses a weighted average, assigned a score of 76 out of 100 based on 17 critics, indicating "generally favorable reviews".

Accolades

See also
 La Soufrière, a 1977 documentary film by Werner Herzog about the La Grande Soufrière volcano in Guadeloupe.
 Salt and Fire, a 2016 thriller film by Werner Herzog about the imminent eruption of a supervolcano in Bolivia.

References

External links
 
 

2016 documentary films
2016 films
Austrian documentary films
British documentary films
Documentary films about volcanoes
Films directed by Werner Herzog
Films shot in Ethiopia
Films shot in Iceland
Films shot in Indonesia
Netflix original documentary films
Films shot in North Korea
Films set in North Korea
Films set in Ethiopia
Films set in Iceland
Films set in Indonesia
2010s English-language films
2010s British films